Innerthal is a municipality in March District in the canton of Schwyz in Switzerland.

History
Innerthal is first mentioned in 1259 as Wegental.  Until 1888 it was known as Hinterwäggithal.

Geography

Of this area, 34.9% is used for agricultural purposes, while 34.1% is forested. Of the rest of the land, 0.4% is settled (buildings or roads) and the remainder (30.6%) is non-productive (rivers, glaciers or mountains).

The municipality is located on Wägitalersee, a reservoir in the upper Wägital.

Demographics
, 2.1% of the population was made up of foreign nationals. Over the last 10 years the population has grown at a rate of 5%. Most of the population speaks German  (97.0%), with Italian being second most common ( 1.8%) and Rhaeto-romance being third ( 0.6%).

 the gender distribution of the population was 48.5% male and 51.5% female.  The age distribution, in Innerthal is; 46 people or 27.5% of the population is between 0 and 19.  44 people or 26.3% are 20 to 39, and 56 people or 33.5% are 40 to 64.  The senior population distribution is 15 people or 9.0% are 65 to 74.  There are 6 people or 3.6% who are 70 to 79 and no one is over 80.

 there are 64 households, of which 13 households (or about 20.3%) contain only a single individual.  5 or about 7.8% are large households, with at least five members.

In the 2007 election the most popular party was the CVP which received 54.8% of the vote.  The next three most popular parties were the SVP (28.3%), the FDP (13.8%) and the SPS (2.5%).

The entire Swiss population is generally well educated.  In Innerthal about 44.5% of the population (between age 25-64) have completed either non-mandatory upper secondary education or additional higher education (either university or a Fachhochschule).

Innerthal has an unemployment rate of 0%.  , there were 22 people employed in the primary economic sector and about 10 businesses involved in this sector.  41 people are employed in the tertiary sector, with 8 businesses in this sector.

There are less than 5 individuals who belong to no church, are agnostic or atheist, and less than 5 individuals did not answer the question.

The historical population is given in the following table:

Weather
Innerthal has an average of 170.8 days of rain per year and on average receives  of precipitation. During this month there is precipitation for an average of 17.1 days.

References

External links
 

Municipalities of the canton of Schwyz